James Neville Mason (15 May 190927 July 1984) was an English actor. He achieved considerable success in British cinema before becoming a star in Hollywood. He was the top box-office attraction in the UK in 1944 and 1945; his British films included The Seventh Veil (1945) and The Wicked Lady (1945). He starred in Odd Man Out (1947), the first recipient of the BAFTA Award for Best British Film.

Mason starred in such films as George Cukor's A Star Is Born (1954), Alfred Hitchcock's North by Northwest (1959), Stanley Kubrick's Lolita (1962), Warren Beatty's Heaven Can Wait (1978), and Sidney Lumet's The Verdict (1982). He also starred in a number of successful British and American films from the 1950s to the early 1980s, including: The Desert Fox (1951), Julius Caesar (1953), Bigger Than Life (1956), 20,000 Leagues Under the Sea (1954),
Journey to the Center of the Earth (1959),
Georgy Girl (1966), and The Boys from Brazil (1978).

Mason was nominated for three Academy Awards, three Golden Globes (winning the Golden Globe in 1955 for A Star is Born) and two BAFTA Awards throughout his career. Following his death in 1984, his ashes were interred near the tomb of his close friend, fellow English actor Sir Charlie Chaplin.

Early life, family, and education
Mason was born on 15 May 1909, in Huddersfield, in the West Riding of Yorkshire, the youngest of three sons of John Mason and Mabel Hattersley, daughter of J. Shaw Gaunt. A wealthy wool merchant like his father before him, John Mason travelled a good deal on business, mainly in France and Belgium; Mabel – who was "uncommonly well-educated" and had lived in London to study and begin work as an artist before returning to Yorkshire to care for her father – was "attentive and loving" in raising her sons. The Masons lived in a house on its own grounds on Croft House Lane in Marsh, which was replaced in the mid-1970s by flats called Arncliffe Court. A small residential development opposite where the house once stood is now called James Mason Court.

Mason was educated at Marlborough College, and took a first in architecture at Peterhouse, Cambridge, where he became involved in stock theatre companies in his spare time. He had no formal training in acting and initially embarked upon it for fun.

Career

1931–1939: Early acting roles 
1931–1933: Early stage work
After Cambridge, Mason made his stage debut in Aldershot in The Rascal in 1931.

He joined the Old Vic theatre in London under the guidance of Tyrone Guthrie. While there he appeared in productions of The Cherry Orchard, Henry VIII, Measure for Measure, The Importance of Being Earnest, Love for Love, The Tempest, Twelfth Night, and Macbeth. Featuring in many of these were Charles Laughton and Elsa Lanchester. In the mid-1930s he also appeared at the Gate Theatre, Dublin, notably in Pride and Prejudice with Betty Chancellor.

In 1933, Alexander Korda gave Mason a small role in The Private Life of Don Juan but sacked him three days into shooting.

1935–1939: Early films

From 1935 to 1938, Mason starred in many British quota quickies, starting with his first film Late Extra (1935), in which he played the lead. Albert Parker directed. Mason appeared in Twice Branded (1936); Troubled Waters (1936), also directed by Parker; Prison Breaker (1936); Blind Man's Bluff (1936), for Parker's The Secret of Stamboul (1936), and The Mill on the Floss (1936), an "A" movie.

Mason had a key support role in Korda's Fire Over England (1937) with Laurence Olivier and Vivien Leigh. He was in another "A", The High Command (1937) directed by Thorold Dickinson, then went back to quickies, starring in Catch As Catch Can (1937), directed by Roy Kellino. Korda cast him as the villain in The Return of the Scarlet Pimpernel (1937)

1938–1939: Television
Mason began appearing in some televised productions of plays, made in the very early days of television: Cyrano de Bergerac (1938), The Moon in the Yellow River (1938), Bees on the Boat-Deck (1939), Square Pegs (1939), L’Avare (1939), and The Circle (1939).

He returned to features with I Met a Murderer (1939) based on a story by Mason and Pamela Kellino, who also starred with Mason and whom he would marry. Her husband Roy Kellino directed.

1941–1947: Leading man status
Second World War

He registered as a conscientious objector during World War II (causing his family to break with him for many years) but his tribunal did not exempt him on the requirement to do non-combatant military service, which he also refused to perform. He appealed against that aspect of the tribunal's decision. His appeal became irrelevant once he was included in a general exemption for film work. In 1941–42 he returned to the stage to appear in Jupiter Laughs by A. J. Cronin. He established himself as a leading man in Britain in a series of films: The Patient Vanishes (1941); Hatter's Castle (1941) with Robert Newton and Deborah Kerr; The Night Has Eyes (1941); Alibi (1942) with Margaret Lockwood; Secret Mission (1942); Thunder Rock (1942) with Michael Redgrave; and The Bells Go Down (1943) with Tommy Trinder.

Mason became hugely popular for his brooding anti-heroes, and occasional outright villains, in the Gainsborough series of melodramas of the 1940s, starting with The Man in Grey (1943). The film was a huge hit and launched him and co-stars Lockwood, Stewart Granger and Phyllis Calvert, to top level stars.

Mason starred in two war time dramas, They Met in the Dark (1943) and Candlelight in Algeria (1944), then returned to Gainsborough melodrama with Fanny By Gaslight (1944) with Granger and Calvert; it was another big hit.

Mason starred in Hotel Reserve (1944), a thriller, then did a ghost story for Gainsborough with Lockwood, A Place of One's Own (1945). Far more popular was a melodrama, They Were Sisters (1945).

Sydney Box cast Mason in a psychodrama about musicians, The Seventh Veil (1945) as the tyrannical guardian of pianist Ann Todd. It was a huge success in Britain and the US and demand for Mason was at a fever pitch.  Exhibitors voted him the most popular star in Britain in each year between 1944 and 1947. They also thought he was the most popular international star in 1946; he dropped to second place the following year. He was the most popular male star in Canada in 1948.

Mason had a relatively minor role in The Wicked Lady (1945) with Lockwood, a big hit. Mason then received his best reviews to date playing a mortally wounded IRA bank robber on the run in Carol Reed's Odd Man Out (1947).

Mason was able to turn producer with Sydney Box on The Upturned Glass (1947), which starred Mason with a script by Mason's wife. It was not particularly successful. Neither was Bathsheba, a play the Masons did on Broadway.

1949–1957: Hollywood stardom
Mason went to Hollywood for his first film, Caught (1949), directed by Max Ophüls.  Mason then played Gustave Flaubert in MGM's Madame Bovary (1949).

He did another with Ophüls, The Reckless Moment (1949), and followed that with East Side, West Side (1949) with Barbara Stanwyck at MGM and One Way Street (1950) at Universal. He made Pandora and the Flying Dutchman (1951) with Ava Gardner. None of these films was particularly successful.

Films at 20th Century Fox

Mason's Hollywood career was revived when he was cast as General Rommel in The Desert Fox: The Story of Rommel (1951), directed by Henry Hathaway. To do the film he agreed to sign a contract with 20th Century Fox for seven years at one film a year.

Mason did a film at Republic Pictures written by his wife and directed by Roy Kellino, Lady Possessed (1951). At Fox, he played a spy in 5 Fingers (1951), directed by Joseph L. Mankiewicz.

MGM hired him to play Rupert of Hentzau in The Prisoner of Zenda (1952) opposite Granger. He was in the lower budgeted Face to Face (1952) then went to Paramount to play a villainous sea captain opposite Alan Ladd in Botany Bay (1953).

Mason was one of many stars in MGM's The Story of Three Loves (1953). At Fox, he reprised his role as Rommel in The Desert Rats (1953), then he was reunited with Mankiewicz at MGM, playing Brutus in Julius Caesar (1953), opposite Marlon Brando. The film was very successful.

Mason worked with Carol Reed in The Man Between (1953), then Fox used him as a villain again in Prince Valiant (1954). Mason did another film with a screenplay by his wife and directed by Roy Kellino, Charade (1954).

Warner Bros., hired him to play Judy Garland's leading man in A Star Is Born (1954) after Cary Grant turned the role down. Mason won the Golden Globe Award for Best Actor – Motion Picture Musical or Comedy and was nominated for the Academy Award for Best Actor. He went over to Disney to play Captain Nemo in 20,000 Leagues Under the Sea (1954), a huge hit which also starred Kirk Douglas. During 1954 and 1955, Mason was the host of some episodes of Lux Video Theatre on CBS television.

Mason appeared with Lucille Ball and Desi Arnaz in Forever, Darling (1956) then starred in and produced a film at Fox, Bigger Than Life (1956), directed by Nicholas Ray. Mason played a small-town school teacher driven insane by the effects of cortisone. He did another for Fox, the hugely popular melodrama, Island in the Sun (1957).

1958–1962: Television and film roles

Mason began appearing regularly on television in shows such as Panic!, General Electric Theater, Schlitz Playhouse, Goodyear Theatre and Playhouse 90 (several episodes including John Brown's Raid).

He starred in two thrillers for Andrew L. Stone, Cry Terror! (1958) and The Decks Ran Red (1958) then played a suave master spy hunting down Cary Grant with romantic assistance from Eva Marie Saint in North by Northwest (1959), directed by Alfred Hitchcock.

At Fox he had a huge hit returning to Jules Verne science fantasy  as the  determined Scottish scientist and explorer in Journey to the Centre of the Earth (1959), taking over a role meant for Clifton Webb.  He did a comedy A Touch of Larceny (1960) and was Sir Edward Carson in The Trials of Oscar Wilde (1960).

He continued to appear on TV shows like The DuPont Show with June Allyson, Golden Showcase, Theatre '62 and The Alfred Hitchcock Hour.

He did The Marriage-Go-Round (1961), then played Dolores' sexually obsessive stepfather Humbert Humbert in Stanley Kubrick's version of Lolita (1962).

He starred in Tiara Tahiti (1962), then Hero's Island (1962), which he also produced. He was in Torpedo Bay (1963).

1963–1970: Supporting roles
In 1963 Mason settled in Switzerland, and embarked on a transatlantic career. He began to drift into support roles, or second leads: the epic The Fall of the Roman Empire (1964); The Pumpkin Eater (1964), with Anne Bancroft; a river pirate who betrays Peter O'Toole's character in Lord Jim (1965); a Chinese noble in Genghis Khan (1965); The Uninhibited (1965); a guest role on Dr Kildare; James Leamington in the Swinging London-set Georgy Girl (1966), a role that earned him a second Academy Award nomination, this one for Best Actor in a Supporting Role.

In 1967, Mason narrated the documentary The London Nobody Knows. An ardent cinephile on top of his career interests, Mason narrated two British documentary series supervised by Kevin Brownlow: Hollywood (1980), on the silent cinema and Unknown Chaplin (1983), devoted to out-take material from the films of Sir Charlie Chaplin. Mason had been a long-time neighbour and friend of the actor and director Charlie Chaplin. In the late 1970s, Mason became a mentor to up-and-coming actor Sam Neill.

He was in several episodes of ITV Play of the Week and he had the lead in The Deadly Affair (1967) for Sidney Lumet (playing a character based on George Smiley though it was renamed);  and Stranger in the House (1968).

He provided a supporting role in Duffy (1968),  The Blue Max (1966) and Mayerling (1968) but was top billed in The Sea Gull (1968) for Sidney Lumet and starred as Bradley Morahan in Age of Consent (1969) for Michael Powell, a film which Mason also produced. The movie featured Helen Mirren's first major film role, and was Powell's last major film. He also had the star role in Spring and Port Wine (1970).

1970–1979: Continued film roles

Mason supported Charles Bronson in Cold Sweat (1970) and Lee Van Cleef in Bad Man's River (1971). He was a support in Kill! Kill! Kill! Kill! (1971) and top billed in Child's Play (1972) for Lumet, replacing Marlon Brando. He was one of many stars in The Last of Sheila (1973) and played the evil Doctor Polidori in Frankenstein: The True Story (1973). He had support roles in The MacKintosh Man (1973), 11 Harrowhouse (1974), The Marseille Contract (1974), and Great Expectations (1974) and was top billed in Mandingo (1975).

Mason's later 70s performances included Kidnap Syndicate (1975), The Left Hand of the Law (1975), Autobiography of a Princess (1975), Inside Out (1975), The Flower in His Mouth (1975), Voyage of the Damned (1976), Hot Stuff (1977), Cross of Iron (1977), Jesus of Nazareth (1977), The Yin and the Yang of Mr. Go (1978), The Water Babies (1978), Heaven Can Wait (1978), The Boys from Brazil (1978), Murder by Decree (1979) (as Watson), The Passage (1979), Bloodline (1979) and as the vampire's servant, Richard Straker, in Salem's Lot (1979).

1980–1985: Final film roles 
Mason was in North Sea Hijack (1980), supporting Roger Moore, Evil Under the Sun (1982), Ivanhoe (1982), and A Dangerous Summer (1982).

One of his last roles, that of the corrupt lawyer Ed Concannon in The Verdict (1982), opposite Paul Newman, earned him his third and final Oscar nomination, for Best Actor in a Supporting Role.

He had parts in Yellowbeard (1983), Alexandre (1983), and George Washington (1984).

Having completed playing the lead role in Dr. Fischer of Geneva (1985), adapted from Graham Greene's eponymous novella for the BBC, he stepped into the role in The Shooting Party originally meant for Paul Scofield, who was unable to continue after being seriously injured in an accident on the first day of shooting. This was to be Mason's final screen performance in a feature film. He did appear on television in A.D. (1985) and The Assisi Underground (1985).

Personal life

Mason was a devoted lover of animals, particularly cats. He and his wife, Pamela Mason, co-authored the book The Cats in Our Lives, which was published in 1949. James Mason wrote most of the book and also illustrated it. In The Cats in Our Lives, he recounted humorous and sometimes touching tales of the cats (as well as a few dogs) he had known and loved.

In 1952, Mason purchased a house previously owned by Buster Keaton. He discovered reels of nitrate film thought to have been lost, stored in the house and produced by the comedian, such as The Boat (1921). Mason arranged to have the decomposing films transferred to safety stock and thus saved them from oblivion.

In his youth, Mason was a keen fan of his local Rugby League team, Huddersfield. In later years he also began to follow the fortunes of Huddersfield Town.

Mason was married twice:
 From 1941 to 1964 to British actress Pamela Mason (née Ostrer) (1916–1996); they had one daughter, Portland Mason Schuyler (1948–2004), and one son, Morgan (who is married to Belinda Carlisle, the lead singer of the Go-Go's). Pamela Mason was widely reported to be a devotee of the Hollywood social scene and was frequently unfaithful to her husband. Nevertheless, she initiated divorce proceedings against him in 1962 for lack of support, claiming adultery on his part with three Jane Does.  This led to a $1m divorce settlement, and made a star of her attorney Marvin Mitchelson.
 Australian actress Clarissa Kaye (1971–his death). Tobe Hooper's DVD commentary for Salem's Lot reveals that Mason regularly worked contractual clauses into his later work guaranteeing Kaye bit parts in his film appearances.

Mason's autobiography, Before I Forget, was published in 1981.

Death
Mason survived a severe heart attack in 1959. He died as result of another heart attack on 27 July 1984 in Lausanne, Switzerland, and was cremated. Mason left his entire estate to his second wife, Clarissa Kaye, but his will was challenged by his two children. The lawsuit had not been settled when she died on 21 July 1994 from cancer. Clarissa Kaye Mason left her holdings to the religious guru Sathya Sai Baba, including the actor's ashes, which she had retained in their shared home. Mason's children sued Sai Baba and subsequently had Mason's ashes interred in Corsier-sur-Vevey, Vaud, Switzerland. The remains of Mason's friend Charlie Chaplin are in a tomb a few steps away. Mason's children specified that his headstone read: "Never say in grief you are sorry he's gone. Rather, say in thankfulness you are grateful he was here", words that were spoken to Portland Mason by U.S. Senator Ted Kennedy after the actor's death.

Acting credits

Film

Television 
{| class="wikitable"
! Year
! Title
! Role
|-
|1962
|Alfred Hitchcock Hour - Captive Audience
|Warren Borrow
|S1 E5 TV Series
|-
|1973
|Frankenstein: The True Story|Dr. John Polidori
|TV miniseries
|-
| 
|Jesus of Nazareth|Joseph of Arimathea
|TV miniseries
|-
|rowspan=2|1979
|North Sea Hijack|Admiral Brinsden
|Released as Assault Force on US TV
|-
|Salem's Lot|Richard K. Straker
|TV miniseries
|-
|1983
|Don't Eat the Pictures|Demon
|TV
|-
| 
|George Washington|Edward Braddock
|TV miniseries
|-
|1985
|A.D.|Tiberius
|TV miniseries
|-
|}

 Theatre 

Radio

 Awards and nominations 

References

External links

 
 
 Performances listed in Theatre Archive University of Bristol
 
 Literature on James Mason
 James Mason interview on BBC Radio 4 Desert Island Discs'', 26 September 1981
 James Mason's Cats

1909 births
1984 deaths
20th-century English male actors
Alumni of Peterhouse, Cambridge
Best Musical or Comedy Actor Golden Globe (film) winners
English conscientious objectors
English male film actors
English male stage actors
People educated at Marlborough College
Actors from Huddersfield
United Nations High Commissioner for Refugees Goodwill Ambassadors
British expatriate male actors in the United States
English expatriates in Switzerland
English expatriates in the United States
James Mason family
United Service Organizations entertainers